

Events
Rambertino Buvalelli becomes podestà of the Republic of Genoa and probably introduces Occitan literature (including troubadour poetry) there
Raimon Escrivan composes  during the Siege of Toulouse
 Enzio of Sardinia (died 1272), knight and general who wrote poems after being captured and imprisoned

Births
 Enzio of Sardinia (died 1272), knight and general who wrote poems after being captured and imprisoned.

Deaths
June – William I of Baux (born 1155), French nobleman and troubadour, dies in a prison in Avignon

13th-century poetry
Poetry